14 de abril. La República is a Spanish period drama television series. Set in the Second Spanish Republic, it is a spin-off of La señora, featuring a number of characters from the latter show. The already produced second season was put in the freeze during the seven years of rule of the People's Party, eventually airing from 2018 to 2019.

Premise 
The fiction starts with Ludi, a female servant, arriving to Madrid from Asturias. In the context of the proclamation of the Second Spanish Republic on 14 April 1931, the Spring of 1931 in the Spanish capital is bustling with those celebrating the advent of the Republic, while those against it prepare for armed struggle. The "De la Torre" family, a landowning family representative of the "stagnant, rancid bourgeoisie", is among those opposing the new government. The son of the family, Fernando de la Torre (Félix Gómez) is engaged to Mercedes León (Mariona Ribas). The members of the lower class "Prado" family work as rangers of the large estate owned by the De la Torre, showing feelings of submission towards their employers conflicted by their endorsement to the promises of agrarian reform brought by the Republic. The offspring of the Prado family are Jesús (Alejo Sauras) and Alejandra (Verónica Sánchez). The extremes of the ideological polarization in play are represented by characters such as Hugo de Viana (Raul Peña), a military officer opposing the Republic and Encarna (Lucía Jiménez), a strong Socialist woman.

The series features a number of characters from La señora such as Encarna, Ventura and Hugo de Viana, played by the same performers.

Cast

Production and release 
Created by Virginia Yagüe and Jordi Frades, the first season started filming in October 2010. It premiered on 24 January 2011. The series subsequently received harsh criticism from the People's Party (PP), then the main opposition party. The 13-episode season ended on 18 April 2011 with good viewer ratings (18.2% share) and a cliffhanger.

The second season was produced by Endemol TV. Slated to air in 2012, the second season of the series was shelved indefinitely because of the arrival of Mariano Rajoy and the PP to government, as they preferred to bury a fiction set in the Republican period. Seven years after, in 2018, only once Pedro Sánchez became prime minister, the airing of the second season was programmed again. In the meantime two of the main cast actors (Héctor Colomé and Álex Angulo) had died. The opening episode of the second season premiered on 3 November 2018 in prime time. The broadcasting run was irregular, to the point the channel sometimes scheduled back-to-back two episodes.

Mired with problems and low viewership ratings, the series ended with the back-to-back broadcasting of the last two episodes aired on 26–27 January 2019.

Season 1

Season 2

References 
Citations

Bibliography
 
 
 
 

Television series set in the 1930s
Television shows set in Madrid
2011 Spanish television series debuts
2019 Spanish television series endings
La 1 (Spanish TV channel) network series
Spanish-language television shows
Censored television series
Period television series
Television series about the history of Spain
Sequel television series
2010s Spanish drama television series
Television series by Diagonal TV